Warping or kedging is a method of moving a sailing vessel, typically against the wind or out from a dead calm, by hauling on a line attached to a kedge anchor, a sea anchor or a fixed object, such as a bollard. In small boats, the anchor may be thrown in the intended direction of progress and hauled in after it settles, thus pulling the boat in that direction, while larger ships can use a boat to carry the anchor ahead, drop it and then haul.

For example, the sloop Adventure under the command of the infamous pirate Blackbeard ran aground attempting to kedge the Queen Anne's Revenge off the bar near Beaufort Inlet, North Carolina in June 1718.

See also
 Kedge anchor
 Warp (disambiguation)
 careening

External links
Escaping a British Squadron
The Mystery of Kedging

References

Sailing